Martin Murray (born 27 September 1982) is a British former professional boxer who competed 2007 to 2020. He held the WBA interim middleweight title from 2011 to 2014, the British and Commonwealth middleweight titles between 2010 and 2012, and challenged five times for a world title.

Professional career

Early career
Murray's professional debut came in September 2007 with a victory over Jamie Ambler at the Robin Park Arena in Wigan. He fought once more that year to finish 2007 with a record of 2–0. A busy 2008 saw Murray fight seven more times scoring seven victories over a series of journeyman opponents. On 22 November 2008, he stepped into the limelight by taking part in the fourth series of the Prizefighter tournament shown live on sky. He scored wins over Joe Rea and Danny Butler before beating former English title challenger Cello Renda in the final to claim the £25,000 first prize. Following the tournament victory Murray marked time with wins over fellow prospect Kevin Concepcion in April 2009 and former Commonwealth title challenger Thomas Awinbono in July of the same year.

Ricky Hatton Promotions
Murray left VIP Promotions after the Awinbono fight to sign with Hatton Promotions. His first fight was on the undercard of Matthew Macklin's European Title win at the Manchester Velodrome. Murray faced George Aduashvili of Georgia on 25 September 2009 and scored a first-round knockout victory.  Following the win Murray said that former British champion Wayne Elcock was on his radar as a man he'd like to beat in order to push himself into future title contention. Murray's next fight on 27 November 2009 instead saw the man from St Helens outpoint Belarus boxer Sergey Khomitsky with a points victory over 8 rounds (Khomitsky was the first opponent, who managed to knock Murray down to the canvas for the first time in his pro career). In his first fight of 2010 Murray continued his winning run against international opposition with a victory over the Georgian middleweight champion Shalva Jomardashvili. A shot at the Commonwealth title against Tanzanian boxer Francis Cheka should then have subsequently followed. However, Cheka was refused a work permit and on 24 May 2010 in Sheffield, Murray instead defeated late replacement Lee Noble in another non-title fight en route to recording his 19th straight victory.

Two years later, Murray gave Nick Blackwell the first loss of his career and won the vacant British Middleweight title on 18 July 2011.

Commonwealth champion
On 16 July 2010 Murray finally fought for a first professional title, the middleweight version of the Commonwealth crown.  His opponent at the fight in the Bolton Arena was Australian Peter Mitrevski Jr.  Murray went the full 12 round distance for the first time in his career and won on a unanimous points decision. Despite the win Murray claimed that he had felt "sluggish" throughout the fight adding that "I know I can perform much better". He followed up the win on 26 November 2010 with a fight for a second title in a row at the Bolton Arena.  His opponent, Brazilian Carlos Nascimento, was the co-challenger for the WBA version of the inter-continental title with Murray winning by stoppage in the third round.

Murray fought against Felix Sturm on 2 December 2011 at the SAP-Arena in Mannheim, Germany for the WBA Middleweight Title. The fight went 12 rounds and ended up being scored a controversial draw.

Second world title attempt
It was confirmed going into his with fight Jorge Navarro at Manchester Arena on 24 November 2012 for the interim WBA World Middleweight Championship, that if Murray were to defeat Navarro, he would be the next in line for a shot at the WBA World Middleweight Championship currently held by Gennady Golovkin. Murray, now 25–0–1, defeated the undefeated Venezuelan by TKO and would fight for the world title against World Middleweight Champion Sergio Martínez in Argentina on 27 April 2013. Murray lost a close, controversial decision in a fight where he put Martinez on the canvas twice but with the referee only counting one knockdown.

Third world title attempt

Following four solid decision victories in the aftermath of his loss to Sergio Martínez, Murray was given the opportunity to face off against the WBA and IBO middleweight champion Gennady Golovkin. Despite a spirited effort (that of which saw him fight into the 11th round, the second time in Golovkin's career he went ten rounds or more), Murray was ultimately stopped for the first time in his career after referee Luis Pabon witnessed him take several hard unanswered shots from Golovkin.

Fourth world title attempt 
After three comeback wins, all of them ending early, Murray was set to challenge for a world title for the fourth time in his career, against Artur Abraham for the WBO super-middleweight title. Murray fought very well on Abraham's home turf in Germany, however, that was not enough for the judges, who scored the fight, 116–111, 115–112 and 112–115 in favor of the home fighter, awarding him the split-decision win. After the fight, a gutted Murray said he was contemplating retirement after another failed attempt to win a world title.

On 25 June 2016, Murray fought George Groves in a WBA final eliminator. Groves pressed Murray throughout most of the fight, earning him a unanimous decision win, with scores of 118–110 on all three judges' scorecards.

On 23 June 2018, Murray fought and defeated Roberto Garcia in a foul-filled fight. Murray had some success with his jab and landed more punches compared to Garcia, which was enough for all three judges to call the fight in favor of Murray.

In his next fight, Murray fought against former champion Hassan N'Dam. Despite scoring a knockdown, Murray did not do enough to earn the win. N'Dam won the fight via majority decision, with only one judge scoring the fight a draw, 114–114, while the other two saw it 117–112 and 116–112 in favor of N'Dam.

Retirement 
Murray announced his retirement 3 weeks after his loss to Saunders. He ended his career with 39 wins (17KOs), 6 loses, and
a Draw.

Professional boxing record

References

External links

Martin Murray – Profile, News Archive & Current Rankings at Box.Live

English male boxers
Middleweight boxers
Super-middleweight boxers
1982 births
Living people
Prizefighter contestants
Sportspeople from St Helens, Merseyside
Commonwealth Boxing Council champions
British Boxing Board of Control champions